Blooming Grove Independent School District is a public school district based in Blooming Grove, Texas, United States.  In addition to Blooming Grove, the district serves the cities of Barry and Emhouse as well as rural areas in west central Navarro County.

Finances
As of the 2010-2011 school year, the appraised valuation of property in the district was $123,193,000. The maintenance tax rate was $0.104 and the bond tax rate was $0.009 per $100 of appraised valuation.

Academic achievement
In 2011, the school district was rated "academically acceptable" by the Texas Education Agency.  Forty-nine percent of districts in Texas in 2011 received the same rating. No state accountability ratings were given to districts in 2012. A school district in Texas can receive one of four possible rankings from the Texas Education Agency: Exemplary (the highest possible ranking), Recognized, Academically Acceptable, and Academically Unacceptable (the lowest possible ranking).

Historical district TEA accountability ratings 
2011: Academically Acceptable
2010: Recognized
2009: Recognized
2008: Academically Acceptable
2007: Academically Acceptable
2006: Academically Acceptable
2005: Academically Acceptable
2004: Academically Acceptable

Schools
In the school year 2011-2012, Blooming Grove ISD had students in four schools.
Regular instructional
Blooming Grove High School (Grades 9-12), 
Blooming Grove Junior High School (Grades 6-8)
Blooming Grove Elementary School (Grades PK-5)
DAEP instructional
Navarro County DAEP/ABC

Special programs

Athletics
Blooming Grove High School participates in the boys sports of baseball, basketball, football, and wrestling. The school participates in the girls sports of basketball, softball, and volleyball. For the 2014 through 2016 school years, Blooming Grove High School will play football in UIL Class 3A Division II.

See also

List of school districts in Texas 
List of high schools in Texas

References

External links
Blooming Grove ISD

School districts in Navarro County, Texas